Within Canadian law, Pension regulation in Canada falls mostly within provincial jurisdiction by virtue of the property and civil rights power under the Constitution Act, 1867. For workers whose employers are subject to federal jurisdiction, such jurisdiction extends to regulating pension plans available to them.

Pension Benefits Act (Ontario)

The Pension Benefits Act  is administered by the Superintendent of Financial Services appointed by the Financial Services Commission of Ontario. Ontario regulates approximately 8,350 employment pension plans, which comprise more than 40 per cent of all registered pension plans in Canada

It was originally enacted as the Pension Benefits Act, 1965 (S.O. 1965, c. 96), and it was the first statute in any Canadian jurisdiction to regulate pension plans.

Overview

 all pension plans in the province must be registered with the Superintendent
 a plan must have an administrator
 the administrator has a statutory duty to exercise care, diligence and skill
 the plan may be either defined benefit or defined contribution, and appropriate rules are in place to protect the benefits that have accordingly accrued to each member
 rules are in effect to determine the value of benefits that may be transferred or divided for family law purposes
 the plan must have sufficient funding to provide the benefits that have been committed under it
 protections are in place in the event of the winding up of a plan, or the underfunding of a plan in the event of the employer's insolvency
 transfers between plans cannot take place without the Superintendent's authorization
 a guarantee fund is in place for guaranteeing certain benefits provided by plans, and it is funded by all employers providing such plans

Content

Manner of regulation by jurisdiction

In addition to registration requirements under the Income Tax Act relating to eligibility of expenses and deductions that are administered by the Canada Revenue Agency, plans are registered in the host jurisdiction as follows:

References

Pensions in Canada
Retirement in Canada
Regulation in Canada